Eusebio Miguel López González [Papo] (July 13, 1892 – February 14, 1976) was an infielder who played briefly in Major League Baseball during the 1918 season. Listed at 5' 10", 165 lb., González batted and threw right-handed. He was born in Havana, Cuba.  
 
González has the distinction of being the first Cuban player to play for the Boston Red Sox, and the 11th Cuban major leaguer overall. He appeared in three games with the 1918 American League champions Red Sox but did not play in the World Series. He went 2-for-5, including two runs and a triple, while playing at shortstop (2 games) and second base (1 game).

González died in his home town of Havana, Cuba at age 83.

See also

List of Major League Baseball players from Cuba

External links

Baseball players from Havana
1892 births
1976 deaths
Boston Red Sox players
Major League Baseball infielders
Major League Baseball players from Cuba
Cuban expatriate baseball players in the United States
Azul (baseball) players
Club Fé players
Almendares (baseball) players
Troy Trojans (minor league) players
Habana players
Binghamton Bingoes players
Springfield Green Sox players
Scranton Miners players
Springfield Ponies players
Toronto Maple Leafs (International League) players
Waterbury Brasscos players
Rochester Tribe players
San Antonio Bears players
Amarillo Texans players
Hartford Senators players
Cuban expatriate baseball players in Canada